Persectania aversa, commonly known as the southern armyworm, is a moth of the family Noctuidae. It was first described in 1856 by Francis Walker.  It is endemic to New Zealand.

References

External links

 Citizen science observations

Hadeninae
Moths of New Zealand
Moths described in 1856
Taxa named by Francis Walker (entomologist)
Endemic fauna of New Zealand
Endemic moths of New Zealand